was a Japanese record label owned by Universal Music Japan. It originally founded in 2009 under Universal Japan's western division, Universal International. Its headquarters were located in Akasaka, Tokyo, Japan. In August 2014, the label became an imprint of Virgin Music. In 2016, Universal Japan announced Delicious Deli would merge with Virgin Music.

Artists

Japan
 Abcho
 Crystal Kay
 D'espairsRay
 
 KAM
 Kim Hyun-joong
 MACO
 Mari Sekine
 Mumtaz Wonder
 Nanase
 Rola
 
 Vamps (2008-2017)

International
 Far East Movement

References

External links
  

Universal Music Japan
Virgin Records
Japanese record labels
Record labels established in 2009
2009 establishments in Japan

Defunct record labels of Japan
Record labels disestablished in 2016